Following is a list of destinations TAAG Angola Airlines flies to as part of its scheduled services, . Terminated destinations are also shown.

TAAG Angola Airlines' network included 28 non-stop destinations, 13 of them domestic ones. The five top domestic routes at this time were Luanda–Cabinda, Luanda–Lubango, Luanda–Ondjiva, Luanda–Huambo and Luanda–Luena. , TAAG Angola Airlines served 31 non-stop destinations. At this time, the carrier  largest markets by seat capacity were Western Europe, Southern Africa and Upper South America. Around one-third of the airline international capacity was in Africa, but only two of TAAG  international markets were within this continent (Namibia and South Africa). Portugal and Brazil were the company top markets based on available seats, followed by the Republic of South Africa, Namibia and the United Arab Emirates (UAE). Services to the UAE ceased in 2015 when flights to Dubai were terminated. In , the number of non-stop destinations reduced to 28, including 12 domestic, 11 in Africa, two in Brazil and Portugal, and one in China. By this time, TAAG two main long-haul markets were Portugal and Brazil, representing approximately 36% and 19%, respectively, of the airline operations.

List

See also
Transport in Angola

References

External links

Lists of airline destinations